The Delay Show is a Ghanaian television program hosted by Deloris Frimpong Manso. The TV program is a talk show that turns to interview industry players in Ghana and the diaspora as well.

Appearance 
The following personalities have been interviewed on the show.

 Sarkodie
 Dr. Kofi Amoah
 Sir John
 Amerado
 Akuapem Poloo
 Wayoosi
Kwadwo Sheldon

References

Ghanaian television shows